The William Glover Negro School or Glover School was a segregated school for Black children in Bealsville near Plant City, Florida. It is located at 5110 Horton Road. On November 29, 2001, it was added to the U.S. National Register of Historic Places.

History
The Bealsville community was established by freed slaves. Prior to 1933 school was held in a church. In 1933, with no funds forthcoming from the School District of Hillsborough County for a school to educate Black children, the community raised $900 to build the William Glover Negro School. In 1940, students sold produce to earn enough money to add a library. In 1947, the school board approved drilling a new well to replace one that was contaminated.
In 1954, along with Pinecrest High School and Plant City High School, the school operated an on-campus strawberry canning facility that was open to the public.

References and external links

 Hillsborough County listings at National Register of Historic Places
 Glover School Site at Florida's Office of Cultural and Historical Programs
 Hillsborough County listings at Florida's Office of Cultural and Historical Programs

National Register of Historic Places in Hillsborough County, Florida